Polepy is a municipality and village in Litoměřice District in the Ústí nad Labem Region of the Czech Republic. It has about 1,300 inhabitants.

Administrative parts
Villages of Encovany, Hrušovany, Libínky, Okna and Třebutičky are administrative parts of Polepy.

References

Villages in Litoměřice District